Passion's Playground is a 1920 American silent drama film produced by and starring Katherine MacDonald. Rudolph Valentino has a featured part in the film  billed as Rudolph Valentine. The film is based on the novel The Guests of Hercules by Charles Norris Williamson and Alice Muriel Williamson. This film is presumed lost.

Plot
As described in a film magazine, Mary Grant (MacDonald), an orphan, leaves an Italian convent and goes to Monte Carlo where, with beginner's luck, she breaks the bank. When her unsophisticated ways lead men to make unseemly advances, she is protected by Prince Angelo Della Robbia (Valentino), whom she later promises to marry. His brother's wife comes to visit her and she learns that she is Marie Grant (Craig), a former student of the same convent who several years earlier had eloped with a man who then deserted her. When a former sweetheart of her husband accuses her of the deed, she places the blame on Mary. Mary goes to a chateau in the mountains. When her life is threatened by crooks, the Prince, after learning the truth of the matter, comes to her rescue, and a happy ending follows.

Cast
Katherine MacDonald as Mary Grant
Norman Kerry as Prince Vanno Della Robbia
Nell Craig as Marie Grant
Edwin Stevens as Lord Dauntry
Virginia Ainsworth as Lady Dauntry
Rudolph Valentino as Prince Angelo Della Robbia (credited as Rudolph Valentine)
Alice Wilson as Dodo Wardrop
Howard Gaye as James Hanaford
Fanny Ferrari as Idina Bland 
Sylvia Jocelyn as Molly Maxwell
Walt Whitman as Cure of Roquebrune

See also
List of lost films

References

External links

Passion's Playground at SilentEra

1920 films
American silent feature films
American black-and-white films
Films based on British novels
Lost American films
1920 drama films
Silent American drama films
First National Pictures films
1920s English-language films
Films based on works by Alice Williamson
1920 lost films
Lost drama films
1920s American films